Kert Toobal (born 3 June 1979) is a former Estonian volleyball player, a long-term captain of the Estonia men's national volleyball team. After retiring from active sport Toobal took up the sporting director position in the Estonian Volleyball Federation.

Estonian national team
Kert Toobal was a member of the Estonian national team from 2001 to 2021 and represented Estonia at the 2009, 2011, 2015, 2017 and 2019 European Volleyball Championships. With the national team Toobal won the 2016 and 2018 European Volleyball League titles.

Sporting achievements

Clubs
Baltic League
  2008/2009 – with Pere Leib Tartu
  2021/2022 – with Bigbank Tartu

National championship
 1998/1999  Estonian Championship, with ESS Falck Pärnu
 1999/2000  Estonian Championship, with ESS Falck Pärnu
 2000/2001  Estonian Championship, with ESS Falck Pärnu
 2001/2002  Estonian Championship, with ESS Falck Pärnu
 2002/2003  Estonian Championship, with Sylvester Tallinn
 2003/2004  Estonian Championship, with Sylvester Tallinn
 2005/2006  Finnish Championship, with Salon Piivolley
 2008/2009  Estonian Championship, with Pere Leib Tartu
 2020/2021  Estonian Championship, with Bigbank Tartu
 2021/2022  Estonian Championship, with Bigbank Tartu

National cup
 1998/1999  Estonian Cup, with ESS Falck Pärnu
 1999/2000  Estonian Cup, with ESS Falck Pärnu
 2000/2001  Estonian Cup, with ESS Falck Pärnu
 2001/2002  Estonian Cup, with ESS Falck Pärnu
 2005/2006  Finnish Cup, with Salon Piivolley
 2006/2007  Finnish Cup, with Salon Piivolley
 2008/2009  Estonian Cup, with Pere Leib Tartu
 2015/2016  French Cup, with Rennes Volley 35
 2019/2020  Estonian Cup, with Bigbank Tartu
 2020/2021  Estonian Cup, with Bigbank Tartu
 2021/2022  Estonian Cup, with Bigbank Tartu

National team
 2016  European League
 2018  European League
 2018  Challenger Cup

Individual
 2004 Estonian Volleyball Player of the Year
 2015 Estonian Volleyball Player of the Year
 2016 French Ligue B – Most Valuable Player
 2016 European League – Best Setter
 2018 European League – Best Setter
 2022 Baltic League – Most Valuable Player
 2022 Estonian League – Best Setter

State awards
 2018  Order of the White Star, 4th Class

Personal life
Kert Toobal is the older brother of former Estonia men's national volleyball teammate Andres Toobal who is the current head coach of Selver Tallinn.

References

1979 births
Living people
Estonian men's volleyball players
Estonian expatriate sportspeople in Belgium
Estonian expatriate sportspeople in Finland
Estonian expatriate sportspeople in France
Estonian expatriate sportspeople in Poland
Estonian expatriate sportspeople in Turkey
Expatriate volleyball players in Belgium
Expatriate volleyball players in Finland
Expatriate volleyball players in France
Expatriate volleyball players in Poland
Expatriate volleyball players in Turkey
Estonian expatriate volleyball players
Recipients of the Order of the White Star, 4th Class
People from Türi